Richard Smith (born September 20, 1950) is an American sports shooter. Smith competed in the mixed skeet event at the 1988 Summer Olympics.

References

1950 births
Living people
American male sport shooters
Olympic shooters of the United States
Shooters at the 1988 Summer Olympics
Place of birth missing (living people)